Dactylosporium is a genus of fungi belonging to the subdivision Pezizomycotina, unknown family.

Species:

Dactylosporium brevipes
Dactylosporium coronatum
Dactylosporium hibisci
Dactylosporium leptosporum
Dactylosporium macropus
Dactylosporium occultum

References

Pezizomycotina
Ascomycota genera